Joe Absolom (born 16 December 1978) is an English actor known for his roles as Matthew Rose in the BBC soap opera EastEnders and Al Large in the ITV comedy drama Doc Martin.

Early life
Absolom was born in Lewisham, London. A former pupil of Forest Hill School, he made early appearances in the Sun-Pat peanut butter advertisements before making his acting debut with the 1991 film Antonia and Jane.

Career
Absolom joined the BBC soap opera EastEnders in 1997 portraying Matthew Rose. He had few storylines in his first year on the show. The storyline which gained him recognition was the murder of Saskia Duncan, which began in February 1999. His character was framed for the murder by the real culprit, Steve Owen (played by Martin Kemp). After getting revenge on Steve Owen, his character's last appearance aired in February 2000. Absolom won Best Actor at The British Soap Awards that same year.

After leaving EastEnders, Absolom played the leading role in the 2002 British horror film Long Time Dead, and a supporting role in the ITV series Vincent. He soon became best known for his role in Doc Martin playing Bert Large's son, Al. The part, since the series began, has won him critical acclaim ever since the series began.

Absolom guest starred in The Bill between 1992 and 2009 in different roles, and as Benny, a violent loan shark in Casualty. He appeared as a criminal in the internet crime thriller Girl Number Nine, also starring Tracy Ann Oberman and Gareth David Lloyd. More recently, he played the part of Ivan in the 2013 horror film 'I Spit on Your Grave 2'. He won a celebrity version of TV show Total Wipeout which aired on 18 September 2010, receiving £10,000 for charity.  He played the real life murderer Christopher Halliwell in the drama A Confession in 2019. He starred in the ITV drama The Bay in 2021.

Radio
Absolom is also a radio actor, and has appeared in a BBC Radio 4 Play of the day "Bringing Eddie Home" by John Peacock, based on a true story of the fight by East End couple Edna and Jack Wallace to get their son's body brought home from Aden, and the ensuing fight for the rights of British Service personnel. Absolom played the role of Eddie Wallace and the play also included other ex-EastEnders actors Bill Treacher, Edna Doré, Todd Carty and Tilly Vosburgh.

Filmography

Film

Television

Awards and nominations

References

External links
 

Living people
English male soap opera actors
English male film actors
English male child actors
People from Lewisham
Male actors from London
20th-century English male actors
21st-century English male actors
Male actors from Kent
People educated at Forest Hill School
1978 births